Les Williams (14 September 1923 – 14 April 1998) was an  Australian rules footballer who played with South Melbourne in the Victorian Football League (VFL).

Notes

External links 

1923 births
1998 deaths
Australian rules footballers from Victoria (Australia)
Sydney Swans players